Joanne McComb was a player in the All-American Girls Professional Baseball League.  Born on March 1, 1933, in Avonmore, Pennsylvania, she was nicknamed Jo by her teammates. She both threw and batted right-handed.

Background
Jo’s father taught her to play baseball. She actually remembers being a young girl and playing ball on the street with the boys. She explained that: “a neighbor came up to my mother and said, ‘Why does your daughter act like that? Why can’t she be more ladylike?’ My mother never said a word.” One of her most significant influences was growing up on a street where all her neighbors enjoyed playing baseball. Every single day, they played a game of baseball in the middle of their street. People from all over town came to watch it.

Jo earned herself a reputation throughout her life as being very helpful to everyone.  She even gave of her time to coach other women. She was a very good friend to everyone too and would often be found helping her friends and neighbors through tough times in their lives. At the same time, she was very self-confident, most likely because of her place in the baseball league.

Professional career
Jo first heard about the league from an article she read in the Pittsburgh Post-Gazette.  In that article the try-outs were mentioned.

She played in first base for the Springfield Sallies in 1950. This was her favorite position.  Her favorite manager was Mitch Skupien and her favorite chaperone was Barbara Liebrich (whose nickname was Bobbie).

Jo’s most memorable baseball-related experience was playing in a Yankee Stadium before a Yankee versus Philadelphia A’s game.

An award was created for Jo at Bloomsburg University, Bloomsburg, Pennsylvania.  It is the “Joanne McComb Outstanding Female Athlete Underclassman Award.”

Career statistics
Seasonal Batting record

References

1933 births
Living people
People from Westmoreland County, Pennsylvania
Baseball players from Pennsylvania
Bloomsburg University of Pennsylvania
All-American Girls Professional Baseball League players
21st-century American women